Orthetrum poecilops is a species of dragonfly in the family Libellulidae. It is found in China and Hong Kong. Its natural habitats are subtropical or tropical mangrove forests and intertidal flats. It is threatened by habitat loss.

References

Libellulidae
Taxonomy articles created by Polbot
Insects described in 1919